Anastacia Lyn Newkirk (born September 17, 1968) is an American singer, songwriter and former dancer. Her first two albums Not That Kind (2000) and Freak of Nature (2001) were released in quick succession to major success. Spurred on by the multi-platinum, global smash "I'm Outta Love", Anastacia was awarded as the 'World's Best-Selling New Female Pop Artist' in 2001. Her commercial success continued with international hits such as "Paid My Dues", "One Day In Your Life" and the official song of the 2002 FIFA World Cup, "Boom". After recovering from cancer, she returned with 2004's Anastacia which deviated from previous albums into pop-rock. Peaking at number one in 11 countries, it became Europe's second-biggest-selling album of the year. Its lead single "Left Outside Alone" remained at number one on the European Billboard chart for 15 weeks and helped Anastacia launch the most successful European tour by a solo artist that same year. The album also provided another three singles: "Sick and Tired", "Welcome to My Truth", and "Heavy on My Heart".

In 2005, the multi-platinum compilation project Pieces of a Dream was released, which spawned the chart-topping duet with Eros Ramazzotti, "I Belong to You (Il Ritmo della Passione)". Her fourth studio album Heavy Rotation (2008) produced the songs "Absolutely Positively", "Defeated", and "I Can Feel You". Her cover album It's a Man's World (2012) was followed by a sixth studio album Resurrection (2014), which reached the top ten of several European charts. Her Ultimate Collection was released in 2015 and peaked in the top ten of the UK charts, giving the singer her sixth top-ten album in Britain. In 2017, Anastacia released the studio album Evolution and its lead single "Caught in the Middle". Anastacia has established herself as one of the best-selling international female singers of the 2000s and 2010s. As of 2016, she has reported worldwide sales of more than 50 million. She has had five top ten singles on U.S. Billboard's Dance Club chart and three albums on its Top Album Sales chart.

She underwent corrective LASIK surgery in August 2005, although she still frequently wears the glasses for which she became noted when she first became famous.

During her life Anastacia has battled many health problems. She was diagnosed with Crohn's disease when she was 13, breast cancer at the age of 34, and supraventricular tachycardia aged 39. In 2013, Anastacia was diagnosed with breast cancer for a second time. In recognition of her decade-long charitable efforts in breast cancer awareness, Anastacia became the second woman ever to be presented with the Humanitarian Award at the GQ Men of the Year Awards in 2013.

Life and career

1968–1998: Early life and career beginnings
Anastacia was born in Chicago, Illinois; her late father Robert Newkirk (of German descent) was a club-singer and her mother Diane Hurley (of Irish descent) an actress on Broadway. Her parents split up when she was five years old. After her father (who had bipolar disorder) left the Newkirk family, they moved to a one-bedroom apartment in New York City when she was a teenager. She enrolled at the Professional Children's School in Manhattan. After graduation, she worked jobs at restaurants and hair salons while pursuing a career in the music industry.

Anastacia was diagnosed with Crohn's disease when she was thirteen. Despite her ongoing health problems Anastacia continued to pursue her ambitions for the next decade. Anastacia started her career in 1983 as a dancer for hire. Her first claim to fame was as a professional dancer (dancer for hire), making regular appearances in the mid-1980s and early 1990s on MTV's Club MTV. She appeared in two music videos for American hip hop trio Salt-N-Pepa ("Get Up Everybody (Get Up)" in 1988 and "Twist and Shout" in 1989). In 1990, she started her musical career as a backing vocalist. She sang back-up vocals on pop star Tiffany's New Inside album in 1990. In 1991, she featured in the music video for "My Fallen Angel" by Dominican singer Coro. In 1992, she gained her first break as a solo singer on BET's television series ComicView, singing Oleta Adams' "Get Here".

In 1993, she moved to Los Angeles to record the song "One More Chance" for the producer OG Pierce, but it brought no record deal. That same year, she recorded a collaboration with David Morales called "Forever Luv". Throughout the mid-1990s producers claimed to be intrigued by her voice's unusual tone, but Anastacia would be continuously told that "her sound just didn't quite fit into any category". In 1994, she sang back-up vocals on Jamie Foxx debut album Peep This, and in 1995, Anastacia sang back-up on Paula Abdul's third studio album Head Over Heels. By 1997, Anastacia had become a member of a band called The Kraze which she remained a part of until 1999. In 1997, she also sung in the background choir for Kurt Carr's gospel vocal ensemble called The Kurt Carr Singers on their album No One Else. She had two duet songs with Cuban composer Omar Sosa, "Mi Negra (1998), Tu Bombón" and "Tienes Un Solo" (1999).

1998–2001: Not That Kind
In 1998, Anastacia was unemployed after being fired from a beauty salon for "being too loud" and she was disappointed after years of bad luck in the music industry. She was considering switching to a career in child psychology. Lisa Braude, who later became her manager, encouraged her to join MTV's talent show The Cut in 1998. Anastacia made her way to be one of the ten finalists, performing her own composition entitled "Not That Kind". Anastacia attracted the interest of record labels after appearing on The Cut hosted by rapper Lisa "Left Eye" Lopes . Even though she did not win, she had impressed Elton John and Michael Jackson as well as the show's judges David Foster and Faith Evans. Anastacia signed a contract with Daylight Records, a custom label of Sony Music Entertainment's Epic Records in March 1999.

Backed up by leading American producers and songwriters, she released her debut album, Not That Kind on June 13, 2000. The album reached the top ten in eight countries in Europe and Asia. It sold four times platinum in Europe and triple platinum in Australia; her debut single "I'm Outta Love" was a global hit in 2000, topping the charts in Belgium, Australia and New Zealand, peaking at number two in France, Switzerland, Italy and Ireland as well as also reaching number six both in Germany and the UK. In the U.S., it was only a minor radio hit. The second single "Not That Kind" reached number 11 in the UK and became a top 10 hit in Italy. It also entered the top 20 in Switzerland and France. "Cowboys & Kisses" was released as the third single from the album, charting in the top forty in some European countries. As the last promotional only single, "Made for Lovin' You" charted in the UK at number twenty-seven and in France at number seventy-two. While "I'm Outta Love" was a top ten hit on the Hot Dance Club Play chart in the United States, "Not That Kind" did not chart on the Billboard Hot 100; however by the end of the year Anastacia became the World's Best Selling New Female Pop Artist at the 2001 World Music Awards.

2001–2006: Freak of Nature, breast cancer diagnosis, Anastacia and Pieces of a Dream
Anastacia's second album Freak of Nature, released in November 2001, achieved success in the UK where it went triple platinum as well as being a hit throughout continental Europe; however, it did not match the success of her international debut. The first single released was "Paid My Dues". The song became an overall hit, in 2001, peaking in Denmark, Italy, Norway, and Switzerland, and reaching the top ten in several other mainland European countries. The second single, released in 2002, "One Day in Your Life", reached number eleven in the UK and the top ten in many European countries. The next single "Why'd You Lie to Me" reached the top thirty in the UK. "You'll Never Be Alone", the fourth single, reached number twenty-eight on the Adult Contemporary chart in the U.S. The album was released in the United States in May 2002. Soon after she released a double disc edition featuring two bonus hits, remixes for three of the tracks on the album and two live tracks taken from a Japan gig that was performed on the September 13, 2002. People magazine reviewed her album, writing "Anastacia is most successful when she shifts gears on more reflective, folk-tinged pop-rock tunes such as "Overdue Goodbye" and "How Come the World Won't Stop" on which her more nuanced vocals flow naturally."

Anastacia joined Celine Dion, Shakira, Cher, Mary J. Blige, Dixie Chicks, and Stevie Nicks for VH1 Divas Las Vegas in 2002 and she also contributed the song "Love Is a Crime" to the Chicago soundtrack. The song peaked at number one on the Hot Dance Club Play chart and enjoyed moderate airplay on Rhythmic/Dance format. Anastacia sang the official song for the 2002 FIFA World Cup held in South Korea and Japan  at the opening ceremony.

In January 2003, Anastacia decided to have  breast reduction because of back strain. From a routine mammogram for the surgery she discovered she had breast cancer. She immediately had surgery and radiotherapy. Anastacia subsequently established the Anastacia Fund to promote awareness of breast cancer among younger women. She has attributed her health scare as an inspiration for her third album. According to an interview she gave in 2005 on British music station The Box, her voice lost its power and she became unable to record, so she spent a long time writing and trying to create a sound with which she could finally be happy.

As stated on the Australian talk show Rove in 2004, Anastacia wanted to have more edge to her vocals as she felt something was missing from her previous work. She brought in rock instruments to create a new atmosphere. She felt that she needed more funkiness and pop but not too much edge. Out of this came a new sound she described as sprock—a combination of soul, pop, and rock. She named the album after herself. Anastacia entered record studios in September 2003 to begin recording the album, working with Glen Ballard, Dallas Austin, and David A. Stewart for release in 2004. On the album, Anastacia also collaborated with P.O.D. lead singer Sonny Sandoval on the socially conscious track "I Do".

The first single, released in March, was "Left Outside Alone", which saw a change in direction for Anastacia. It was one of the biggest songs in Europe of 2004, reaching number one in Austria, Italy, Spain, and Switzerland; number two in Denmark, Germany, Ireland, the Netherlands, and Norway; and number three in the United Kingdom and Hungary. Overall the song remained at number one on the European Billboard singles chart for 15 weeks. The song also topped the Australian charts, Anastacia's second number one in the country, where it went on to become the second-biggest-selling single of 2004.

Anastacia quickly became her most successful album to date, giving her a third consecutive triple platinum album in the UK and reaching the top of the national charts in Ireland, the Netherlands, Australia, Greece, Germany and other countries. Unlike her first two albums, which were released in her homeland of America, Anastacia was not, despite being scheduled for release on three occasions. "Left Outside Alone" was released twice, but failed to pick up heavy airplay. It only gained sporadic Adult Contemporary format airplay. Again, it sparked Rhythmic/Dance format airplay and the dance mix of "Left Outside Alone" peaked at number five on the Hot Dance Club Play chart. After the original version of "Left Outside Alone" failed to catch on after lukewarm promotion, especially on radio, the album was postponed and eventually cancelled after the release date of August 30, 2004, passed. Anastacia released three further internationally successful singles; "Sick and Tired" (which gave her another number one in Spain and another UK top five single), "Welcome to My Truth" (her best-selling hit in Spain), and the ballad "Heavy on My Heart", sales of which went towards the Anastacia Fund (a charitable organization providing research funding for breast cancer).A small batch of her self-titled album was released with a bonus DVD, poster and slip case. The DVD includes a making-of documentary, footage from her 2002 Europe Promo Tour, and a photo gallery. From September 2004 to August 2005, Anastacia embarked on the Live at Last Tour. In 2005 the tour was renamed the Encore Tour. The tour would become the second most popular tour of 2004 behind only U2. In late 2005, she released her first greatest hits collection, called Pieces of a Dream, named after a track of the same name. The album spawned the hit singles "Pieces of a Dream", which peaked at number one in Spain, and the duet with Eros Ramazzotti, "I Belong to You (Il Ritmo della Passione)", which was a number 1 hit in Germany, Hungary, Italy and Switzerland and a hit throughout continental Europe. Even though Sony BMG required her to release this collection, Anastacia has said that she is happy now that it was created, as it was like a "story book", or summary of the first six years of her career. In 2005, she was recognized for worldwide sales of over 20 million.

Not long after the release of "I Belong to You (Il Ritmo Della Passione)", Anastacia released her first live DVD Live at Last on March 27, 2006, in Europe. The DVD contains footage from concerts in Berlin and Munich. It includes music videos to her four singles; "Left Outside Alone", "Everything Burns", "Pieces of a Dream", and "I Belong to You (Il Ritmo Della Passione)", five alternative videos ("I Do", "Rearview", "Seasons Change", "Underground Army", and "Time") to songs from her self-titled album, and a documentary about the tour. Soon after the DVD release. Anastacia took a break from the music industry and began concentrating on her growing fashion line with S.Oliver. In late 2006, Anastacia and German fashion brand S.Oliver launched a clothing collection called "Anastacia by s. Oliver", which was sold at 550 stores worldwide. A limited-edition CD named "Welcome to My Style" was also available for free to customers who spent 60 euros or more on the clothes in November. A limited edition clothing line called "Limited Luxury" was also launched on November 2, 2007, which was designed together with Swarovski.

2007–2013: Heavy Rotation, collaborations, It's a Man's World and second breast cancer 

Anastacia attended the memorial Concert for Diana on July 1, 2007, which would have been on Diana's forty-sixth birthday. This was one of the first major events to take place in the new Wembley Stadium, and one of her first major appearances since she took a break from the industry. She opened the medley section of the show and sang a rendition of "Superstar", from Andrew Lloyd Webber's Jesus Christ Superstar, with a gospel chorus behind her.
In August 2007, a video was posted on the "Anastacia by S. Oliver" web site. During the video, when Anastacia was asked about her future plans, she confirmed that she was working on an album as well as the clothing line. A specific month of release or title was not mentioned. In November 2007, her biography on the official Anastacia website was updated to say there would be an album in 2008, with a tour to follow. It was in this period also that Anastacia left Sony and moved to Mercury. During an interview for the UK breakfast show This Morning, the singer said that David Massey's move from Sony to Mercury was key to her own label change because Massey had originally signed her and had been involved in all of her previous albums.

On July 24, Anastacia announced that her fourth studio album Heavy Rotation would be released in Europe and Asia on October 27, 2008 (and elsewhere in 2009). The album featured collaborations with producers Ne-Yo, The Heavyweights, Lester Mendez, J.R. Rotem, and Rodney Jerkins,  departing from the pop rock sound of her previous material. The album's first single, called "I Can Feel You", began playing in some radio markets on August 25, 2008. The second single from Heavy Rotation was "Absolutely Positively", later served as a promotional single only. The third official single from the album, "Defeated", was released as a promotional single in Europe without a music video.

Her fourth studio album proved to be less successful; her singles failed to reach the top 40 in her most commercially successful country (UK). Anastacia remained positive, stating that other artists have faced the same problems while changing a record label, also blaming the world economic crisis and the label's decision to alter her sound from her own "sprock" sound of her previous record to a more "urban feel". In later years Anastacia regretted the change of sound, citing personal problems that led to a creative sell-out. Regardless of the lack of success, the album was ranked number ten on Billboard magazine's online "Readers' Poll: 10 Best Albums of 2008". In 2009, the Women's World Award presented Anastacia with the World Artist Award, recognizing the singer's success and ongoing positive influence.

In June 2009, Anastacia began her second tour throughout Europe to promote her fourth studio album. The tour was funded by the singer herself, not her label, and was well received by critics and fans alike. In November and December 2009 Anastacia, Chaka Khan and Lulu were headlining the Here Come the Girls a special Christmas concert that visited the United Kingdom only.

On December 7, 2009, Anastacia opened the annual Royal Variety Performance with Lulu and Chaka Khan, performing a rendition of "Relight My Fire". The tour sold out 24 shows. In October 2009, Anastacia released a collaborative single with British band Ben's Brother entitled "Stalemate", which was included on the band's album Battling Giants.
During the winter of 2009, Anastacia once again joined Lulu for the Here Come the Girls Tour with Heather Small replacing Chaka Khan. In March 2010, Anastacia  re-entered the recording studio. Around this time, she headlined several shows at Art on Ice in Zürich, the Hallenstadion and Lausanne. Her website stated: "In a unique, groundbreaking combination of Olympic-level figure skating and smash hit pop, the music of Anastacia will soundtrack and seamlessly inspire a performance from some of the world's best figure skaters, perfectly choreographed to complement her hits."During the summer of 2010 Anastacia became one of the main judges on British talent series Don't Stop Believing, a contest inspired by the musical comedy-drama Glee. During promotion for the reality show the singer stated that she had left Mercury Records and was without a label. Following "Stalemate", Anastacia released "Safety", a duet with Russian singer Dima Bilan, recorded in Los Angeles in May 2010. The song was performed live for the first time at the Muz-TV Music Awards Moscow in June 2010 and was released as a single in Russia in August 2010. On August 13, Anastacia announced that she would join Belgian singer Natalia Druyts for a joint tour, Natalia Meets Anastacia, for six arena shows performed at the Sportpaleis, Belgium. On August 17, Natalia and Anastacia recorded a collaborative single, "Burning Star", which was released on September 17, 2010, to promote the concert series. On November 13, Anastacia became the first international singer to perform a concert in Northern Cyprus, which is occupied by Turkish forces. In February 2011, Anastacia was a guest at the Gigi D'Alessio concert at Radio City Music Hall in New York, performing as an opening act. On November 11, 2011, she performed in Madrid for the SAP Sapphire Conference.
In June 2012, Anastacia was confirmed as a guest judge for the ninth series of The X Factor UK at the Glasgow auditions alongside judges Louis Walsh, Gary Barlow and Tulisa Contostavlos. Her appearance on the show was highly praised saying that she had "great chemistry" with the others and had greatly impressed the producers, causing speculation that the singer would become the new fourth judge. However it was later revealed that she had to reject the judging offer due to contractual agreements for the Night of the Proms European winter tour as well of the release of her independent cover album.

During summer 2012, Anastacia toured throughout Europe. In July 2012, Anastacia announced on her Twitter page and Facebook fan page the release of a commercial single for car company Škoda Auto. She performed the song "What Can We Do (Deeper Love)" for the first time on July 10 in the Jazz Festival in Montreaux, Switzerland. She later released the video for the song through her social media pages. On September 17, it was announced that Anastacia had signed with the "BMG Masters Model" service of BMG Rights Management, along with the service's primary German-based distributing partner, Rough Trade Distribution. Global distribution is expected to be achieved via a range of partnering labels and distribution services. The deal included the release of her next two albums, It's a Man's World, a collection of covers of songs by male rock artists released on November 9, 2012, followed by an album of original material.

Throughout November and December 2012 Anastacia took part in the annual Night of the Proms, a series of concerts held in Belgium, the Netherlands, and Germany which combine classical music with famous pop songs. On February 2, 2013, Anastacia tweeted that she would start writing for her next studio album of new material in the following week. In 2012, Anastacia starred in the film All You Can Dream, directed by Valerio Zanoli.

On February 27, 2013, Anastacia announced that she had cancelled her European tour because she was diagnosed with breast cancer for the second time and was undergoing treatment. Due to her decade-long charitable efforts in breast cancer awareness, Anastacia became only the second woman to be presented with the Humanitarian Award at the GQ Men of the Year Awards in 2013. Anastacia later confirmed via her Twitter account that she was writing and recording songs for her sixth studio album, including working with producers John Fields and Steve Diamond. She also stated it would mark a return to her "sprock" sound.

2014–2020: Resurrection, Ultimate Collection and Evolution

The album, entitled Resurrection, was released in May 2014 and was met with both critical and commercial success, giving the singer her sixth top ten Italian album and fifth top ten UK album. It also reached the top 5 of the Swiss and German charts and the top ten of the Dutch charts. Reviews were overwhelmingly positive, acknowledging a return to form for the singer as well as a creative resurgence. The lead single "Stupid Little Things" was released on April 4, 2014. The single was moderately successful, reaching the top ten in Belgium and top 20 in Italy. It was quickly met with a positive reaction from music critics, with MTV's Brad Stern naming it one of the "5 Must-Hear Pop Songs of the Week!" and calling it a "return to form" for the "pop princess and proof that Anastacia's a true survivor", after her second battle with breast cancer. Anastacia was given the German Radio Regenbogen Award for Charity and Entertainment in April 2014.

In June 2014, Anastacia announced that due to a hernia procedure she would be unable to promote the album for a number of weeks. After returning to her promotional tour Anastacia played numerous festivals throughout Europe including headlining Manchester Pride which was heavily praised. She was also named as one of the judges on the German talent show Rising Star. In November 2014, Anastacia began her Resurrection Tour, her first tour to include Australia. The tour ended in September 2015 after 80 shows and was well received by fans and critics. During this period it was also announced that Anastacia had re-signed with her original label and that a compilation album would be released. In 2015, Anastacia released a jewelry collection with Tat 2 Designs, which consisted of bracelets, earrings and necklaces by Anastacia and designer Briana Erin.Anastacia's Ultimate Collection was released in November 2015 and peaked in the top ten of the UK charts, giving the singer her 6th top ten album in Britain. During the same month Anastacia attended The Children For Peace Gala at Spazio Novecento in Rome where she received the special artist award. As of 2016, she has sold over 52 million albums worldwide. In August 2016, Anastacia became a contestant on the fourteenth series of the British television dance contest Strictly Come Dancing, broadcast BBC One. Partnered with dancer Brendan Cole, the couple were voted in the bottom two to compete in the dance-off in the show's second week. A doctor ruled Anastacia unable to compete from an injury sustained during the previous day's performance, and instead the result was decided by selecting the competitor with the higher number of audience votes. The decision was controversial, resulting in complaints, and judge Bruno Tonioli reportedly threatened to quit. She was eliminated from the show in its sixth week.

On February 17, 2016, Women's Wear Daily announced that Anastacia teamed up with Blumarine for an eyewear collection. "The Blumarine Eyewear by Anastacia" capsule collection included three styles of sunglasses and two optical frames, and was released in April 2016. In June 2017, she supported Lionel Richie in some of the UK dates of his All the Hits Tour. The following July, she released a new single, "Caught in the Middle" which preceded her seventh studio album Evolution, released in September 2017. After the success of her album, she embarked on her Evolution Tour to promote the record. In 2018, she appeared on Ballando con le stelle, the Italian version of Dancing with the Stars, in a special one-off performance. In January 2019, it was announced that Anastacia would portray Killer Queen in the 2019 Dutch run of the We Will Rock You musical. She performed in Amsterdam and The Hague from December 6, 2019, to January 13, 2020, covering various Queen songs.

2021–present: The Masked Singer and I'm Outta Lockdown Tour 2022

Anastacia was revealed as the winner of the third season of The Masked Singer Australia in October 2021, competing as the "Vampire" mask making her the first American singer to win the show. Singing cover songs on The Masked Singer reminded Anastacia of her early career when she was trying to establish herself as an artist. When speaking to Australian media outlets in 2021, she suggested that Evolution (2017) could be her last album and she might only release singles in the future. However, in October 2022, she announced that she is preparing to release her eighth studio album in 2023.

In November 2021, Anastacia announced a concert tour, I'm Outta Lockdown – The 22nd Anniversary European Tour in 2022. The tour was planned for the 20th anniversary of the release of her debut single "I'm Outta Love" in 2020, but was delayed due to the COVID-19 pandemic. The tour ran from September to February 2023, and was well-received, with the Newcastle World writing: "There’s no denying that Anastacia is a true performer, she knows how to work a crowd (she made hilarious commentary throughout the whole show), and has the type of stage presence that most performers would kill to have. However, what stuck with me the most wasn’t actually her vocal and performing talents, but rather her personality. As I mentioned earlier, she communicated with the crowd in a hilarious yet lovely manner – thanking everyone for their support throughout, making jokes and also sending positive messages surrounding mental health and kindness.".

On February 7, 2022, Anastacia released the single "American Night", the theme song to the 2021 film American Night starring Jonathan Rhys Meyers and Paz Vega; Anastacia made a cameo appearance. The official music video was released the same day. In November 2022, Anastacia released a capsule collection called "Not That Kind of Bag Collection", with Italian brand Poshead. She designed three exclusive bags named after her songs: Not That Kind, Freak of Nature and Paid My Dues.

Philanthropy
Anastacia has supported many nonprofit organizations and attended various charity events such as Life Ball in 2006 (Europe's largest annual AIDS charity event), Make a Difference and Challenge for the Children. Anastacia was one of the fifteen artists to record their take on a Disney song on the compilation album Disneymania (2002). Anastacia recorded "Someday My Prince Will Come" from Snow White and the Seven Dwarfs. It is also included on the Collector's Edition of her second album.

In 2003, Anastacia took part in the charity event, 46664, organized by Nelson Mandela to raise awareness of AIDS. She sang with U2 and Queen, and also contributed to the song "Amandla", recording the song and providing some of the lyrics. Annie Lennox joined forces with Anastacia and 22 other female artists to raise awareness of the transmission of HIV to unborn children in Africa. The single "Sing" was released on World AIDS Day, December 1, 2007, in conjunction with Annie Lennox's appearance at the Nelson Mandela 46664 concert in South Africa.
After being diagnosed with cancer, Anastacia created "The Anastacia Fund" in partnership with Estée Lauder. The organization helps raise awareness about breast cancer and the importance of mammograms to women 35 and under. Anastacia began selling her stage clothing on eBay, donating a portion to the Breast Cancer Research Foundation. The auctions were hosted by an eBay Trading Assistant and Certified Business Consultant. New listings began every Friday for 6 months.

In 2008, she performed at the "Pink Ribbon Gala" in Stockholm, she appeared on "Divas II", a benefit concert along with many other female artists as well as performing at the ChildLine Concert in Dublin.

Personal life
In 2003, Anastacia bought a house in Beverly Hills, which she described in 2017, as the most expensive thing she has ever bought. She sold the home for $3 million in July 2018, and relocated to Florida later that year. On December 23, 2022, Anastacia announced in an Instagram post that she has moved to Denver, Colorado.

She is the godmother of Bobbi-Loua, the daughter of the Belgian singer Natalia.

In a 2017 interview, she expressed an interest in writing a book, saying: "I also want to write my autobiography. There are so many things people don’t know about me."

Health 

Over the course of her life Anastacia has battled numerous health problems including being diagnosed with Crohn's disease at age 13, breast cancer at age 34, and the heart condition supraventricular tachycardia, which the singer discovered she had at age 39. In February 2013, it was announced that Anastacia was battling a more intense form of breast cancer. In recognition of her decade-long charitable efforts in breast cancer awareness, Anastacia became only the second woman to be presented with the Humanitarian Award at the GQ Men of the Year Awards in 2013.

Relationships 
Anastacia was in a relationship with actor Shawn Woods from 1994 to 2001. On July 11, 2005, People magazine reported that Anastacia had split with her boyfriend of one year, German DJ Patrice Bouédibéla.

Anastacia married her bodyguard Wayne Newton in Huatulco, Mexico, on April 21, 2007. She became a step-mother to his two children from a previous relationship. In April 2010, it was confirmed that the two had filed a petition for divorce, citing irreconcilable differences. She wrote the song "Pendulum" of her divorce, saying: "It's totally about the loss of my marriage, but it's a beautiful song. I think I lost a bit of myself for a while. My career got so busy I'd be thinking: 'Who the hell I am?'"

Tattoos 
Anastacia has several tattoos on her back, and one below her neck saying "Forever" in an unusual font. In 2008 she added wings to this tattoo. She also has an ankh on her lower back, which appeared on her first album. Since it represents eternal life, to her fans it has come to symbolize her. Her third tattoo is at the base of her neck just above "Forever" and is her only coloured tattoo. It says A&W to symbolise her marriage to Wayne Newton. Although the pair are now divorced Anastacia has said she does not regret the tattoo.

Public image 
She has appeared in television commercials for Mastercard's "Something for the Fans" campaign, Skoda, Honda, and Dr Pepper, in which she sang "Be You" with Cyndi Lauper. She has graced the covers of numerous international magazines, including Ecuador's Cosmopolitan; Germany's Maxim; Bulgaria's Eva; Italy's Grazia; UK's Fault, Fabulous and Love Sunday and the Netherlands' Veronica. She has also appeared in pictorials for US's FHM and Playboy and UK's You.

Anastacia is well-known for writing her own songs, which are often autobiographical and uplifting, saying:

She wrote her single "Paid My Dues" about her early career in the music industry. In an interview with Billboard, she said: "For years, I had been told my voice was too black, that I should get contacts and ditch the glasses, that I was too in-your-face, the list goes on. Now, these are the very things that people respond to."

Discography

 Not That Kind (2000)
 Freak of Nature (2001)
 Anastacia (2004)
 Heavy Rotation (2008)
 It's a Man's World (2012)
 Resurrection (2014)
 Evolution (2017)

Filmography

Tours

Headlining
Live at Last Tour 
Heavy Rotation Tour 
Resurrection Tour 
Ultimate Collection Tour 
Evolution Tour 
I'm Outta Lockdown Tour 

Co-headlining
Here Come the Girls 
Art on Ice 
Natalia Meets Anastacia 
Night of the Proms 

Promotional
US Club Tour 
Europe Promo Tour 
Australian Promo Tour 

Opening act
Rocket Man: Greatest Hits Live 
All the Hits Tour

Awards

See also
 Artists with the most number-one European singles
 List of number-one dance hits (United States)
 List of artists who reached number one on the U.S. dance chart

References

External links 

 
 Anastacia at Allmusic
 Anastacia at Billboard
 
 

 
1968 births
Living people
Age controversies
20th-century American singers
American dance musicians
American women rock singers
American women pop singers
American women singer-songwriters
American rock songwriters
American cannabis activists
American people of German descent
American people of Irish descent
Mercury Records artists
Singers from Chicago
American expatriates in England
Sony BMG artists
Sony Music Publishing artists
World Music Awards winners
MTV Europe Music Award winners
American mezzo-sopranos
20th-century American women singers
21st-century American women singers
People with Crohn's disease
Dance-pop musicians
Singer-songwriters from Illinois
Masked Singer winners
Live Here Now artists
Fifa World Cup ceremonies performers